Sri Sai Baba National Degree College is an autonomous degree college located in Anantapur, Andhra Pradesh, India. It is a Government Aided College also known as Sai Baba College.The College, named after Sri Shiridi Sai Baba, was established in October 1981 under the aegis of the Anantapur District National Education (ADNE) Trust, Anantapur founded by late Sri Sirivaram Adinarayana Rao in the year 1942.

History
This co-educational Institution was inaugurated by Sri Bhavanam Venkatarami Reddy, the then honourable Minister for Education, Government of A.P. In October 1981, this Institution was started under able stewardship of the Late Dr. B.Purnachandra Rao as the Special Officer and the Late Sri P.Konappa Sastry, an advocate, as the Correspondent. S.V. University, Tirupati granted affiliation at the first instance for six years and approved the Courses offered in the Institution. To start with, there were 500 Students, limited Staff, and a few Courses spread over the different faculties of History, Economics, Commerce, Political science, Botany, Zoology, Physics, Chemistry and Mathematics. Under the leadership of the Correspondent and the Special Officer, the first All Association Day was celebrated in February 1983. In keeping with the motto of service to society, the first NSS unit was also started during this period and the Late Dr. G.L.N. Murthy, Reader in Commerce, was the first Programme Officer.
In the year 1984, Dr. K.V.S. Prasad assumed the office of Principal-in-Charge and the Late Sri K.S.Jayaram was the pro tem Correspondent. Dr. K.V.S. Prasad was elevated to the position of Principal in 1992. Sri P.L.N. Reddy, who was, an experienced Correspondent for both the High School and Junior College for two decades, took of the charge from Sri K.S.Jayaram as the Correspondent of the Degree College in the year 1985.

Dr. K.V.S. Prasad, the first Principal of the Institution, served over a long period of two decades. There was a rapid expansion of buildings year by year with required infrastructure and increase in the intake of the students. Introduction of self-financing Courses and multidisciplinary Courses in B.Sc. (Microbiology, Biochemistry, Electronics and Computer Sciences) and B.Com. (Computer Applications) are the order of the day. IGNOU Study Centre was started in 1988 with strength of 50. It provides opportunities for employees to acquire higher academic qualifications. The Study Centre has grown by leaps and bonds since then. Many Students are pursuing different Undergraduate and Postgraduate Courses and Diploma and Certificate Courses at SSBN College Study Centre through IGNOU. Sri Venkateswara University, Tirupati, granted the College permanent affiliation in the year 1987. Later, in the year 1988, the affiliation of the College was changed from S.V. University, Tirupati to Sri Krishnadevaraya University, Anantapur. The Govt. of A.P. was pleased to admit this College to grant-in-aid in 1990 with munificent help of Sri N.Janardhana Reddy, the then Chief Minister of A.P with whom Sri P.L.N.Reddy, our Correspondent, is associated as a member of the syndicate Sri Venkateswara University, Tirupati for over a decade. In January 1992, this Institution was admitted under Sec. 2(f), and Sec.12 (b) of the U.G.C Act, 1956. PG Diploma in Computer Applications and M.Sc. (IS) were introduced in 2001.
Dr.K.Nirmalamma, the first female principal, assumed office in July 2002.

Provision
The College offers diversified modern self-financing Courses suitable to changed circumstances.  It is planned that this College will have more modern PG Courses before the end of the present decade.

Universities and colleges in Anantapur district
1981 establishments in Andhra Pradesh
Educational institutions established in 1981